Hwangbo In (1387–10 November 1453) was a Joseon Dynasty politician who was Chief State Councillor from 1450 to 1453 during the era of King Munjong and King Danjong. As the King Danjong was 12 years old when the latter succeeded as King, Hwangbo In and his ally, Left State Councillor or Vice Prime Minister, General Kim Jongseo extended their powers during the court and so, Grand Prince Suyang produced a coup d'état and killed Hwangbo In, Kim Jongseo and their allies.

Family 
 Father - Hwangbo Rim (황보림, 皇甫琳) (1333 - 1394)
 Grandfather - Hwangbo Ahn (황보안, 皇甫安)
 Mother - Lady Ahn of the Tamjin Ahn clan (탐진 안씨, 耽津 安氏)
 Grandfather - Ahn Woo (안우, 安祐) (? - 1362)
 Sibling(s)
 Older brother - Hwangbo Jeon (황보전, 皇甫琠)
 Wive and children 
 Lady Yi of the Yangseong Yi clan (양성 이씨, 陽城 李氏)
 Son - Hwangbo Seok (황보석)
 Son - Hwangbo Eun (황보은)
 Son - Hwangbo Heum (황보흠)
 Daughter - Lady Hwangbo of the Yeongcheon Hwangbo clan (영천 황보씨, 永川 皇甫氏)
 Son-in-law - Kim Man-seo (김만서, 金晩緖) from the Sacheon Kim clan 
 Daughter - Lady Hwangbo of the Yeongcheon Hwangbo clan (영천 황보씨, 永川 皇甫氏)
 Son-in-law - Hong Won-suk (홍원숙, 洪元淑) from the Namyang Hong clan 
 Daughter - Lady Hwangbo of the Yeongcheon Hwangbo clan (영천 황보씨, 永川 皇甫氏)
 Son-in-law - Yun Dang (윤당, 尹塘)
 Daughter - Lady Hwangbo of the Yeongcheon Hwangbo clan (영천 황보씨, 永川 皇甫氏)
 Son-in-law - Kwon Eun (권은, 權訔)

Popular culture
 Portrayed by Shim Yang-ho in the 2011 JTBC TV series Insu, The Queen Mother.
 Portrayed by Lee Chang-jik in 2013 film The Face Reader.

References

External links
Hwangbo In at Encyclopedia of Korean Culture 

Joseon scholar-officials
1387 births
1453 deaths
Executed Korean people
Yeongcheon Hwangbo clan